England Lionesses may refer to:
 England women's national football team
 England women's national rugby league team